"The Last Gunfighter Ballad" is a song written by Guy Clark and originally recorded by Johnny Cash for his 1977 album The Last Gunfighter Ballad.

Released in early 1977 as a single (Columbia 3-10483, with "City Jail" on the B-side), the song reached number 38 on U.S. Billboard country chart for the week of April 2.

Track listing

Charts

References

External links 
 "The Last Gunfighter Ballad" on the Johnny Cash official website

Johnny Cash songs
1977 songs
1977 singles
Songs written by Guy Clark
Columbia Records singles